The Basel Program was the first manifesto of the Zionist movement, drafted between 27-30 August 1897 and adopted unanimously at the First Zionist Congress in Basel, Switzerland on 30 August 1897.

In 1951 it was replaced by the Jerusalem Program.

History
The Basel Program was drafted by a committee elected on Sunday 29 August 1897 comprising Max Nordau (heading the committee), Nathan Birnbaum, Alexander Mintz, Siegmund Rosenberg, Saul Rafael Landau, together with Hermann Schapira and Max Bodenheimer who were added to the committee on the basis of them having both drafted previous similar programs (including the "Kölner Thesen").

The seven-man committee prepared the Program over three drafting meetings.

Goals
The program set out the goals of the Zionist movement as follows:

The original draft did not include the word for "publicly recognized"; this was the only amendment made during the debate at the Congress, and can be seen in the final version with the word öffentlich inserted via a curly bracket. The amended draft was approved unanimously by the 200-person congress.

References

Bibliography
 
 
 

Pre-1948 Zionist documents
1897 documents
German-language works
Jews and Judaism in Basel
Zionism in Switzerland